All the Rage is a 1997 American film by New York City-based writer Roland Tec. It was released theatrically in the U.S., was widely reviewed in numerous publications and continues to be a top-grossing film among gay-themed titles on Netflix and Amazon.

All the Rage had its world premiere at the Castro Theatre during the San Francisco International Film Festival of 1997 after which it was released theatrically in the U.S. by Jour de Fete, a division of Rialto Pictures. In 2001, Strand Releasing brought the film out on DVD and in 2003, it was released internationally by Media Luna, GHB.

Hailed by Los Angeles Times film critic Kevin Thomas as "One of the sharpest, sexiest and most amusing satires of gay life and values ever filmed," it widely considered a hallmark of the Queer Independent Film movement of the late 1990s. This unique aspect of the film was highlighted in one of its first reviews by Dennis Harvey, writing about the film for Variety.

The film features music by a number of indie artists, including Merle Perkins, who recorded the song "Military Man".

Principal cast

References

External links 

 

1998 films
1997 comedy films
American LGBT-related films
American satirical films
1990s English-language films
American independent films
Gay-related films
1997 LGBT-related films
1997 films
1998 comedy films
1990s American films